Bower Studios (or simply Bower) is a furniture and design studio based in Brooklyn. They specialise in making mirrors, but they also offer furniture, lighting, and accessories. They also collaborate with other artists on special projects.

The studio's partners are Danny Giannella, co-founder and creative director, Tammer Hijazi, co-founder and design director, and Jeffrey Renz, development and sales director.

Collaborations 
In 2020, they partnered with Stærk&Christensen (designer Camilla Stærk and model/photographer Helena Christensen) on a mirror for their BOWERx collaboration series.

See also 
Culture of New York City

References

External links 

 

American furniture designers